Gurminder Thind (born January 29, 1984) is a former Canadian football guard for the Montreal Alouettes of the Canadian Football League. He was drafted by the Alouettes in the fourth round of the 2008 CFL Draft. He played college football for the South Carolina Gamecocks.

External links
Montreal Alouettes bio

1984 births
Living people
Sportspeople from Mississauga
Canadian football offensive linemen
South Carolina Gamecocks football players
Montreal Alouettes players
Players of Canadian football from Ontario